Mekong Capital is a Vietnam-focused private equity firm. Operating in Vietnam since 2001, Mekong Capital is one of the first private equity firms to engage Vietnam, and has completed 42 private equity investments (including 28 full exits) in Vietnam through 5 funds with more than 60 full-time employees. Mekong Capital has offices in Ho Chi Minh City, Hanoi. Focusing on manufacturing companies until 2005, Mekong Capital shifted its focus towards consumer-driven businesses in 2006. Mekong Capital is known as a private equity firm that has invested significant resources in the development of its corporate culture, and in the corporate cultures of its  portfolio companies, and is the subject of several case studies.

Mekong Capital won Private Equity International's awards for five years in a row, including Operational Improvement Award for Asian Small Caps for 2013, Frontier Market Firm of the year for 2014, Operational Excellence Award 2015 for the Asia-Pacific Small Cap Category, Frontier Market Firm of the year in Asia for 2016, and Operational Excellence for a small cap investment in Asia for 2017.

Mekong Capital was founded by Chris Freund in 2001. Chris Freund was formerly with Templeton Asset Management, based in Vietnam and Singapore, from 1995 to 2001.

Some of Mekong Capital's well-known investments include:
The Gioi Di Dong (MobileWorld) - Vietnam's largest mobile device retail chain, with over 1,300 mobile phone stores, 700 larger-format consumer electronics stores, and 300 mini-supermarkets under its third retail concept, by the time Mekong Capital completed its full divestment.  Mekong Capital fully exited The Gioi Di Dong in January 2018, generating a return multiple of 57x and an IRR of 61.1% on a cumulative basis, making it one of the most successful investments in the history of Asia's Private Equity.
Golden Gate - Vietnam's leading restaurant operator with around 250 restaurants across more than 14 brands. 
Vietnam Australia International Schools (VAS) - One of the largest K-12 private school chains in Vietnam, with 8 campuses for the 2016/2017 school year;
Traphaco - The market share leader in the manufacturing, branding, and distribution of traditional medicines and herbal supplements in Vietnam;
Loc Troi Group - The largest distributor of plant protection chemicals in Vietnam, and a pioneer in vertically integrated rice processing in Vietnam;
Phu Nhuan Jewelry - The largest jewelry retail chain in Vietnam, with over 200 stores;
Masan Consumer - The largest packaged food FMCG company in Vietnam;
Asia Chemical Corp (ACC) - The largest locally owned specialty chemical distribution company in Vietnam.

Exits
By January 2018, Mekong Capital has achieved 24 complete exits of investments that were unlisted at the time of the original investment: Tan Dai Hung Plastic, Duc Thanh Wood Processing, Saigon Gas, Mai Son Retail, Masan Consumer, Minh Phuc Printing, International Consumption Products (ICP), AA Corporation, Goldsun JSC, Lac Viet Computing Corporation, Nam Hoa Wooden Toys, Digiworld, MK Smart, Ngo Han; Venture International, Golden Gate, FPT Corporation, Nam Long, Intresco, Vietnam Australia International School, Phu Nhuan Jewelry (PNJ), Loc Troi Group, Traphaco and The Gioi Di Dong (MobileWorld).

Mekong Capital's Divestment HistoryI

IIncludes only investments that were unlisted at the time of Fund's initial investment
IIPartial exit

Mekong Capital is holding several other investments in companies that were unlisted at the time of the original investment and are now listed: Traphaco, Phu Nhuan Jewelry, Intresco, and MobileWorld.

Funds
Mekong Enterprise Fund, Ltd. - Launched in 2002, this fund focuses on private equity investments in Vietnamese SMEs, typically private family-owned manufacturing businesses 
Mekong Enterprise Fund II, Ltd. - Launched in 2006, this fund focuses on private equity investments in fast-growing private Vietnamese companies with excellent management teams, typically in consumer-driven industries 
Vietnam Azalea Fund, Limited. - Launched in 2007, this fund focuses primarily on pre-IPO investments, including privatizations
Mekong Enterprise Fund III, Ltd. - A private equity fund launched in 2016, focusing on consumer-driven industries in Vietnam, typically looking to deploy $8 million to $15 million per deal.
Mekong Enterprise Fund IV, Ltd. - Launched in 2019, this fund focuses on retail, education, restaurants, consumer services, FMCG, and health care. The funds portfolio includes Mutosi, HSV Group, Entobel, and Maison Marou. MEFIV targets investments ranging from $10-35 million and can make both minority and buy-out investments.

Vision Driven Investing
Vision Driven Investing is a private equity value creation framework that applies best practices from Private Equity, Executive Coaching, Leadership Development, Corporate Transformation, and Change Management in a Private Equity context.

The framework involves aligning around a shared vision with investee companies, subsequently aligning around a business plan with clear milestones and measurable targets for achieving that vision, actively tracking progress against those milestones, and partnering with the investee company to execute the plan in a way that the company is empowered to achieve the vision regardless of the obstacles encountered.

Mekong Capital’s application of Vision Driven Investing is featured in a case study by Harvard Business School entitled Mekong Capital: Building a Culture of Leadership in Vietnam, as well as a case study by London Business School entitled Mekong Capital: The Importance of Corporate Culture in Emerging Markets Private Equity.

References

External links
Mekong Capital website

Companies based in Ho Chi Minh City
Financial services companies established in 2001
Private equity firms of Vietnam
Vietnamese companies established in 2001